UN Spanish Language Day is observed annually on 23 April. The event was established by the UN's Department of Public Information in 2010, seeking "to celebrate multilingualism and cultural diversity as well as to promote equal use of all six of its official working languages throughout the organization". Later, the day was changed to 23 April, to pay tribute to Spanish writer Miguel de Cervantes Saavedra, who died on 22 April 1616.

See also 
 Columbus Day
 International Mother Language Day
 International observance
 Official languages of the United Nations

References

External links 
 UN Spanish Language Day - Official Site (Spanish)

October observances
Spanish
Spanish language
Recurring events established in 2010